Hank (originally titled Awesome Hank and PRYORS)  is an American sitcom that ran on ABC from September 30, 2009, to November 4, 2009. The series was created by Tucker Cawley and is about a Wall Street executive who loses his job and reconnects with his small-town family. Hank originally aired on Wednesday nights in the fall season and starred Frasier actor Kelsey Grammer. The series was produced by McMonkey Productions and Werner Entertainment, in association with Warner Bros. Television.

Cast
 Kelsey Grammer as Hank Pryor – a Wall Street CEO who loses his job
 Melinda McGraw as Tilly Pryor – Hank's wife for 19 years
 Jordan Hinson as Maddie Pryor – Hank and Tilly's 15-year-old daughter
 Nathan Gamble as Henry Pryor – Hank and Tilly's son
 David Koechner as Grady Funk – Tilly's hillbilly brother

Episodes
A total of 10 episodes of Hank were filmed and five have been aired, but on November 11, 2009, ABC said it had "no immediate plans" to air the others.

U.S. ratings

Reception
The show received negative reviews from critics, scoring a 36/100 in Metacritic, with viewers agreeing with the critics, scoring it at a 4.1/10. The Los Angeles Times has noted "There's nothing here you couldn't imagine from the premise, but there's also nothing wrong with what's here: McGraw is a good foil for Grammer, and Grammer is good at what he does." The New York Post panned the show: "Hank is one of the worst new (or old) comedies of this or many other seasons".

Cancellation
Hank was officially cancelled on November 11, 2009 amidst low ratings and bad reviews. A total of ten episodes of the series have been produced, leaving five episodes unaired. ABC stated that they had no immediate plans to air the remaining episodes. Special programs and reruns of comedy shows aired in its place. In a December 2009 interview with Jay Leno, Kelsey Grammer admitted that he had initially called Warner Bros. to ask that the show be cancelled because it was too unfunny. The unaired episodes have since aired in the UK on BT Vision and in Croatia on Doma TV.

References

External links

American Broadcasting Company original programming
2009 American television series debuts
2009 American television series endings
Television shows set in Virginia
Television series by Warner Bros. Television Studios
2000s American sitcoms
English-language television shows

Official Twitter handle is @hankeisam